Boka may refer to:

Places 
 Boka (Sečanj), village in Vojvodina, Serbia
 Boka (waterfall), a waterfall in western Slovenia
 Bauka, California, a former Maidu village
 Boka Kotorska, a geographical region in Montenegro

People 
 Boka (footballer) (born 1988), Brazilian footballer
 Arthur Boka (born 1983), Ivorian footballer
 Boka (singer) (1949–2020), Armenian singer

Other uses 
 Boka (restaurant), in Chicago